H.A. Hellyer is a British scholar and analyst. He writes on the politics of the modern Middle East and North Africa, faith and politics in Europe and internationally, majority-minority relations, security issues and the Muslim world–West relations. He is a scholar at the Carnegie Endowment for International Peace, and a fellow of Cambridge University's Centre for Islamic Studies. Previously, he was a senior nonresident fellow at the Atlantic Council's Center for the Middle East, and associate fellow at the Royal United Services Institute. Previously a nonresident fellow at the Brookings Institution's Foreign Policy section, and he was also Democracy Non-Resident Fellow for the academic year 2014 to 2015 at the John F. Kennedy School of Government of Harvard University.

Hellyer was previously senior practice consultant at the Abu Dhabi Gallup Center, and senior research fellow at the University of Warwick. Hellyer was appointed to the British government's Taskforce on Tackling Radicalisation and Extremism. Hellyer was appointed as deputy convener of the United Kingdom taskforce on tackling radicalization and extremism after the 7/7 bombings in London in 2005. He also served as the U.K. Foreign and Commonwealth Office’s (FCO) first economic and social research council fellow, within its Islam team and counter-terrorism team.

He is the author of a number of books and articles, including Muslims of Europe: the 'Other' Europeans, and A Revolution Undone: Egypt's Road beyond Revolt.

Early life and education

Hellyer was raised between the UK and the Middle East.

Career
After receiving his PhD from the University of Warwick, Hellyer was made Fellow of the University of Warwick. He was appointed as Deputy Convenor of the UK government's Taskforce on Tackling Radicalisation and Extremism in the aftermath of the 2005 London bombings.

He is a Fellow of the Young Foundation, that specializes in social innovation to tackle structural inequality, as well as other institutions.  He was a long-term consultant on Demos think tank projects ‘Community Engagement and Counter-terrorism’ and ‘Counter-radicalisation & Muslim communities’.

Hellyer was a Ford Fellow of the Center for Middle East Policy at the Brookings Institution, as well as a UN Alliance of Civilizations (UNAOC) Global Expert. Additionally, as the recipient of a law degree from the University of Sheffield, he taught as a visiting professor of law at the American University in Cairo.

Hellyer was a senior practice consultant and senior analyst at the Abu Dhabi Gallup Center. He contributed a post-Mubarak pre-Sisi piece on Egypt to Chatham House studies on international affairs.

Middle East

In 2009, Hellyer gave an invited talk at the UK Embassy in Bahrain.

In 2010, Hellyer took part in a series of debates entitled "The future of Islam in Europe" and hosted by the British Council in Switzerland.

In 2011, Hellyer gave a seminar in Singapore for the International Institute for Strategic Studies on the "Arab Spring".

Bibliography
 H.A. Hellyer. Muslims of Europe: The "Other" Europeans. Edinburgh University Press, 2010.
reviewed by Deepa A. in Islamonline 
Review by T.Parray in Journal of Muslim Minority Affairs Volume 31, Issue 2, 2011, pages 293-295
Review by T. Hadian in Emel, 2010
reviewed by Alexandre Caiero in Review of Middle East Studies Vol. 47, No. 1 (Summer 2013), pp. 89-91
H.A. Hellyer A Revolution Undone: Egypt's Road beyond Revolt Hurst and Company/Oxford University Press, 2016

References

External links
 The Dialogue Society: Dr H.A. Hellyer
 Institute for Social Policy and Understanding: H.A. Hellyer
 BBC World Service "Doha Debates": This House believes the Sunni-Shia conflict is damaging Islam's reputation as a religion of peace 29 April 2008
 BBC World Service "Doha Debates": Of Minarets, Islam and Switzerland: a conversation with Dr H.A.Hellyer

Living people
Alumni of the University of Warwick
Year of birth missing (living people)
British political journalists
Scholars of Sufism
Alumni of the University of Sheffield
Islam and politics